Michael F. Foley (born October 5, 1955) is an American football coach.  He is the offensive line coach at the University of Massachusetts Amherst.  Foley served as the head football coach at Colgate University for five seasons from 1988 until 1992, compiling a record of 21–34.

Head coaching record

References

External links
 UMass profile

1955 births
Living people
American football offensive linemen
Bates Bobcats football coaches
Colgate Raiders football coaches
Colgate Raiders football players
Dartmouth Big Green football coaches
Harvard Crimson football coaches
Holy Cross Crusaders football coaches
UConn Huskies football coaches
UMass Minutemen football coaches